The second inauguration of Tsai Ing-wen as the 15th president of Taiwan was held on May 20, 2020, marking the second four-year term of Tsai Ing-wen as president and Chen Chien-jen as vice president. Before this, candidate of Democratic Progressive Party, Tsai won the election in 2020 in a landslide. Festivities were sharply curtailed by efforts to prevent the spread of COVID-19.

Inaugural Events

Oath of office 

Held at 9:00a.m, swore to Sun Yat-sen, Tsai recited the following:

After that, the Secretary-General to the President, Secretary-General of National Security Council and President of the Executive Yuan, began to take oaths, who were administered by The President Tsai.

Inaugural address 
Due to attendance restrictions designed to prevent the spread of COVID-19, Tsai delivered her address Taipei Guest House instead of The President Office. 
In the speech, Tsai mentioned COVID-19 pandemic crisis.

References

See also 
 2020 Taiwanese presidential election

2020 in Taiwan